Peter Reading (27 July 1946 – 17 November 2011) was an English poet and the author of 26 collections of poetry. He is known for his deep interest for the nature and use of classical metres. The Oxford Companion to Twentieth-Century Poetry describes his verse as "strongly anti-romantic, disenchanted and usually satirical". Interviewed by Robert Potts, he described his work as a combination of "painstaking care" and "misanthropy".

Background
Reading was educated at Alsop High School. After studying painting at Liverpool College of Art, he worked as a schoolteacher in Liverpool (1967–68) and at Liverpool College of Art, where he taught Art History (1968–70). He then worked for 22 years as a weighbridge operator at an animal feed mill in Shropshire, a job which left him free to think, until he was sacked for refusing to wear a uniform introduced by new owners of the business. His only break was a two-year residency at Sunderland Polytechnic (1981–83). After leaving Liverpool, he lived for 40 years in various parts of Shropshire, in later years in Little Stretton, near Ludlow.

The benevolence of America’s Lannan Foundation rescued him from poverty. He was the first writer to hold the one-year Lannan writing residency in Marfa, Texas (in 1999), and is the only British poet to have won the Lannan Award for Poetry twice, in 1990 and 2004, as well as the only poet to read an entire life’s work for the Lannan Foundation’s DVD archive – his filmed readings for Lannan (made in 2001 and 2010) of 26 poetry collections make up the only archive of its kind.  His 1997 collection Work in Regress was shortlisted for the T.S. Eliot Prize.

Awards
Cholmondeley Award (1978)
Dylan Thomas Award (1983), for Diplopic
Whitbread Prize for Poetry (1986), for Stet
Lannan Literary Award for Poetry, 1990 and 2004.

Poetry collections
Water and Waste (1970)
For the Municipality's Elderly (1974)
The Prison Cell & Barrel Mystery (1976)
Nothing for Anyone (1977)
Fiction (1979)
Tom o'Bedlam's Beauties (1981)
Diplopic (1983)
5x5x5x5x5 (1983)
C (1984)
Ukulele Music (1985)
Going On (1985)
Essential Reading (1986)
Stet (1986)
Final Demands (1988)
Perduta Gente (1989)
Shitheads (1989)
Three in One (1991)
Evagatory (1992)
Last Poems (1994)
Collected Poems Vol 1: 1970-1984 (1995)
Eschatological (1996)
Collected Poems Vol 2: 1985-1996 (1996)
Chinoiserie (1997)
Work in Regress (1997)
Apopthegmatic (1999)
Ob (1999)
Repetitious (1999)
Marfan (2000)
[untitled] (2001)
Faunal (2002)
Civil (2002)
Collected Poems Vol 3: 1997-2003 (2003)
-273.15 (2005)
''Vendange Tardive (2010)

See also 
 English translations of Homer: Peter Reading

Notes

Further reading
Isabel Martin (2000), Reading Peter Reading

External links
At Contemporary Writers
Biography
Peter Reading Poems in Qualm
Peter Reading in the Metropolitan Museum, New York

1946 births
2011 deaths
Costa Book Award winners
People from Walton, Liverpool
Alumni of Liverpool College of Art
English male poets
20th-century English poets
20th-century English male writers
Poets from Liverpool